Iván Darío Agudelo Zapata (b.  August 15, 1967) is a Colombian lawyer and politician. He was a Member of the Colombian House of Representatives representing Antioquia. He is currently a senator in the Senate of Colombia. In the 2010 legislative elections, he was elected Representative to the House for Antioquia with the endorsement of the Colombian Liberal Party with 22,022 votes. In the 2014 legislative elections he was reelected with 40,356 votes into the House of Representatives. During the 2018 legislative elections, he was elected Senator of the Republic with 68,034 votes.

Biography 
Agudelo Zapata is a lawyer from the University of Medellín with a specialization in business law from the Autonomous University of Bucaramanga. He was a professor at the University of Medellín between 1998 and 2006. He was an advisor to the Antioquia government between 1998 and 2003. Between 2003 and 2006, he was a representative of the Guardian and Protection of Human Rights, before the Medellín Prosecutor's Office. In 2007 he was elected deputy of Antioquia for the period 2008-2012 with 16,266 votes. In July 2009 he resigned his seat to run for the House of Representatives.

In the 2010 legislative elections, he was elected Representative to the House for Antioquia with the endorsement of the Colombian Liberal Party with 22,022 votes. In the 2014 legislative elections he was reelected with 41,327 votes.

Congress of Colombia 
After being elected as a congressman in the 2018 legislative elections, being the speaker of the creation of the new Ministry of Science, Technology and Innovation, which was successfully created by the Colombian Senate on 16 December 2018.

Reference 

1967 births
Living people
People from Antioquia Department
Colombian politicians
Members of the Chamber of Representatives of Colombia
20th-century Colombian lawyers
21st-century Colombian politicians
Universidad de Medellín alumni
Autonomous University of Bucaramanga people
21st-century Colombian lawyers